Thiaroye Arrondissement  is an arrondissement of the Pikine Department in the Dakar Region of Senegal. The seat lies at Thiaroye.

It is subdivided into 5 communes d'arrondissement; Diack Sao, Diamaguène Sicap M'Bao, M'Bao, Thiaroye sur Mer and Thiaroye-Gare.

References

Arrondissements of Senegal
Dakar Region